Ignacy Tadeusz Baranowski (born 4 February 1879 in Lublin - 26 November 1917 in Warsaw) was a Polish historian.

He specialized in the history of Warsaw and history of the Polish peasants.

Publications
Komisje porządkowe w latach 1765-1788 (1907)
Z dziejów feudalizmu na Podlasiu (1907)

1879 births
1917 deaths
20th-century Polish historians
Polish male non-fiction writers
Writers from Lublin